The golden angwantibo (Arctocebus aureus) is a strepsirrhine primate of the family Lorisidae. It shares the genus Arctocebus with the Calabar angwantibo (Arctocebus calabarensis) and together they are commonly called the golden pottos. The golden
angwantibo is found in Cameroon, the Republic of Congo, Equatorial Guinea and Gabon. Its usual habitat is rain forest, but it has also been known to live on farmland.

Like the Calabar angwantibo, the golden angwantibo weighs between 266 and 465 grams and has a stumpy tail, abbreviated index fingers, a specialised grooming claw on each foot and a white line on its face. It can be distinguished from its cousin largely by its colour. The fur on its back is red-gold, with a more muted red on its belly. Unlike the Calabar angwantibo, the golden angwantibo has no nictitating membrane.

The golden angwantibo is a nocturnal and arboreal species that is typically found on small branches 5–15 metres above ground. Its diet consists of around 85% insects (especially caterpillars) and 14% fruit. Its foraging, antipredator, social and reproductive behaviour are extremely similar to those of the Calabar angwantibo.

References

External links

 Golden potto (Arctocebus aureus) at The Primata

golden angwantibo
Fauna of Central Africa
Mammals of Cameroon
Mammals of the Republic of the Congo
Mammals of Equatorial Guinea
Mammals of Gabon
Primates of Africa
golden angwantibo
golden angwantibo